{{DISPLAYTITLE:C7H7Cl}}
The molecular formula C7H7Cl (molar mass: 126.58 g/mol, exact mass: 126.0236 u) may refer to:

 Benzyl chloride, or α-chlorotoluene
 Chlorotoluenes

Molecular formulas